The 1980 Utah Utes football team was an American football team that represented the University of Utah as a member of the Western Athletic Conference (WAC) during the 1980 NCAA Division I-A football season. In their fourth season under head coach Wayne Howard, the Utes compiled an overall record of 5–5–1 with a mark of 2–3–1 against conference opponents, placing seventh in the WAC. Home games were played on campus at Robert Rice Stadium in Salt Lake City.

Schedule

Roster

Season summary

BYU

NFL Draft
Three Utes were selected in the 1981 NFL Draft.

References

Utah
Utah Utes football seasons
Utah Utes football